This article is a summary of the 2020s in science and technology.

Biology and medicine

 DeepMind used artificial intelligence for the first time to predict protein folding.
Singapore became the first jurisdiction to approve the sale of cultured meat.
The vaccines produced by Pfizer/BioNTech and Moderna against Coronavirus disease 2019 became the first vaccines developed using Messenger RNA and mark the fastest vaccine development and approval, taking only 10 months.
Oregon became the first jurisdiction to legalize the medicinal use of psilocybin for mental health treatment.

Energy 

 QuantumScape revealed that it had created the first functioning prototype of a  solid-state battery, promising to massively increase battery capacity.
 The Chinese Experimental Advanced Superconducting Tokamak was turned on for the first time. The China Fusion Engineering Test Reactor is being planned for commissioning later in the decade.
 Group14 Technologies has patented SCC55, a silicon-carbon composite, leading to 50% more in fully lithiated volumetric energy density than graphite used in conventional lithium-ion battery anodes.

Environmental sciences 

 The United Nations has designated the 2020s as the Decade of Ocean Science for Sustainable Development.

Space
NASA's Mars 2020 mission, which includes the Perseverance rover, was successfully launched on 30 July 2020 to study the habitability of Mars in preparation for future human missions.
The Chang'e 5 successfully landed on the surface of the moon in 2020.
 16 September 2021, SpaceX launched Inspiration4. It was the first orbital launch of an all-private crew, including first person with a prosthesis who was also the youngest person in space (aged 29). 
 NASA's Artemis 1 mission to the Moon launched on 16 November 2022 to test the Space Launch System rocket.
 The James Webb Space Telescope was successfully launched on 25 December 2021. On 12 July 2022, the first full-color images captured was released to the public which included Webb's First Deep Field and others.
 India hopes to conduct its first human spaceflight, Gaganyaan in late 2024.
 The first component of the Lunar Gateway, a proposed inhabitable space station to be implemented by multiple international space agencies on the Moon, the Power and Propulsion Element, is set to be delivered by an undetermined commercial launch vehicle in 2022.
 ESA's Jupiter Icy Moons Explorer is scheduled to be launched in April 2023.
 SpaceX founder and entrepreneur Elon Musk plans to send the first Starship to Mars in the 2029, paving the way to the colonization of the planet.
 NASA plans to send "the first woman and the next man" to the Lunar south pole region via Artemis 3 in 2025.
 The European Space Agency plans to begin mining the moon for natural resources by 2025.

Transport

Air 

 In 2021, United Airlines revealed plans to purchase 15 supersonic Boom Overture aircraft by the end of the decade.

Land 
 Waymo became the first company to offer self-driving car services to the general public without a human supervisor in Chandler, Arizona.
Autonomous delivery vehicles began transporting food to customers in Texas in 2021.

Computing and artificial intelligence

 Artificial intelligence-assisted coding began to emerge in the early 2020s.
 El Salvador passed Bitcoin law to become the first country to give cryptocurrency and bitcoin the status of legal tender.

Robotics and machine learning

Physics
 In January 2020, Physicists discovered a unique metal with billions of quantum entangled electrons.
The Large Hadron Collider will once again begin operation in early 2021; the collider was shut down in December 2018 "to enable major upgrade and renovation works."

Paleontology

Archaeology

See also

 History of science and technology
 List of science and technology articles by continent
 List of years in science
  in science
 Impact of the COVID-19 pandemic on science and technology
 History of technology by type
 List of science timelines

References

 
 
21st century in science
Science and technology by decade
2020s-related lists
2020s decade overviews